Intiyuq K'uchu (or Pintasqa Wayq'u) is an archaeological site in Peru with rock paintings. It is located in the Cusco Region, Calca Province, Lamay District.

Intiyuq K'uchu is a Quechuan name that means ""a corner with (a) sun". Inti means sun; -yuq is a suffix that denotes ownership; k'uchu means "corner". It is alternately spelled Intiyoqk'uchu.

Pintasqa Wayq'u (or Pintasqawayq'o) means "painted valley": Pintay ("to paint") is a borrowing from Spanish pintar; wayq'u/wayq'o means "valley".

References 

Rock art in South America
Archaeological sites in Peru
Archaeological sites in Cusco Region